Aapadbandhavudu is a 1992 Indian Telugu-language drama film written and directed by K. Viswanath. Produced by Edida Nageswara Rao's Poornodaya Movie Creations, the film stars Chiranjeevi and Meenakshi Seshadri while Jandhyala, Sarath Babu, and Geetha play supporting roles. It was the third collaboration between Chiranjeevi and Viswanath after Subhalekha (1982) and Swayam Krushi (1987).

The film won critical acclaim with five state Nandi Awards, including the Nandi Award for Best Actor for Chiranjeevi, and the Filmfare Award for Best Actor – Telugu for Chiranjeevi. The film was screened at the International Film Festival of India, the Asia Pacific Film Festival, and the AISFM Film Festival. The film was later dubbed and released into Tamil as Veera Marudhu.

Plot 
Madhava is a loyal friend, servant, and cowherd to Hema and her father. He also performs in the local dramas, in which he portrays Shiva. Hema's father is a school teacher and a talented poet. However, since his classical poetry is no longer popular, he cannot find a publisher to print his poems. Even though Hema and Madhava love each other, neither realize this due to the societal divisions of caste and economic class present in their village. Hema is the first to realize her love for him, during a drama where she portrays Parvati, but suppresses her feelings owing to the social stigma.

One day, in order to pay for the wedding of Lalitha, Hema's elder sister, Madhava sells his cows and gives the money to Hema's father through a family friend, as a loan. When Hema's father hears what he has done, he gives Madhava his manuscripts to have them printed. Madhava goes to town to have them printed, however, when he returns, he sees Hema being taken away to an asylum. He learns about the incident which led Hema's current mental state, i.e., Hema's brother-in-law's attempted rape and Lalitha's death.

Madhava pretends to be mentally unstable and is admitted to the same asylum, where he goes through many hardships in order to save Hema. After stopping a guard from attacking her, he is falsely accused of attempted rape and is given shock therapy. He tries many times to help her regain her memory. When she finally does and realizes what he did for her, she wants to marry him after she is safely rescued. However, Madhava objects to her proposal as he is from the lower strata of society. Hema's fiancé, Sripathi convinces him to change his mind. Hema and Madhava finally unite.

Cast

Soundtrack 

All songs are composed by M. M. Keeravani and audio is owned by Lahari Music.

Awards 
Nandi Awards
 Third Best Feature Film - Bronze – Edida Nageswara Rao
 Best Actor – Chiranjeevi
 Best Dialogue Writer – Jandhyala
 Best Art Director – B. Chalam & Arun D Ghodgavnkar
 Best Choreographer – Bhushan Lakhandri

Filmfare Awards South
Filmfare Award for Best Actor – Telugu – Chiranjeevi 
Filmfare Award for Best Director – Telugu – K. Viswanath
 Filmfare Award South nomination as Best Actress – Telugu for Aapadbandhavudu

References

External links 
 

1992 films
Films directed by K. Viswanath
Films scored by M. M. Keeravani
1990s Telugu-language films
Films about rape in India
Films about women in India
Medical-themed films
1990s avant-garde and experimental films
Indian romantic drama films
Films set in psychiatric hospitals
Films about depression
Indian nonlinear narrative films
Psychiatry in fiction